Chiba 1st district was a constituency of the House of Representatives in the Diet of Japan. Between 1947 and 1993 it elected initially four, later five Representatives by single non-transferable vote. It was located in Chiba and, as of 1993, consisted of the cities of Chiba (w/o the former town of Toke), Funabashi, Yachiyo, Ichihara and Narashino. Today, the area extends into Chiba's 1st, 2nd, 3rd, 4th and 9th single-member electoral districts.

Until the decline of the LDP in the 1970s after the oil crisis and the Lockheed scandal, the relatively urban district was won by a majority of LDP candidates several times. Representatives for Chiba 1st district included LDP faction leader and home affairs minister Shōjirō Kawashima (Kawashima faction), defense minister Shigejirō Inō (Satō faction), construction minister Ihei Shiseki (Fukuda faction), sōri-fu minister Sōichi Usui (Miki faction) and his son Hideo Usui (Miki (→Kōmoto) faction) and, in the final election period before the election reform, opposition politicians Yoshihiko Noda (JNP) and Kazuo Shii (JCP) who later went on to play leading roles in the opposition parties.

Summary of results during the 1955 party system

Elected representatives

Late election results

References 

History of Chiba Prefecture
Districts of the House of Representatives (Japan)